Pigritia laticapitella is a moth in the family Blastobasidae. It is found in the United States, including Texas, Kansas, California, New Jersey, Pennsylvania, Maine, Ohio and South Carolina.

References

Moths described in 1860
Blastobasidae